Jacquelyn Camille Herron (born December 25, 1981) is an American ultramarathon runner.

Career
She is the first and only athlete to win all three of the road IAU World Championships for 50K, 100K, and 24 Hours. She won the 2017 Comrades Marathon and holds several World Record times at ultramarathon distances, along with the Guinness World Record for the fastest marathon in a superhero costume. She is known for running with her hair down, drinking beer, and eating tacos during ultramarathons. In November 2017, she broke Ann Trason's 100-mile Road World Record by over an hour in 12:42:40. She surpassed her 12-Hour (ratified) and 100 Mile (pending ratification) World Records in February 2022 at the Jackpot 100/US Championship and won the race outright. In April 2022, she became the youngest woman to reach 100,000 lifetime miles. She is the first woman to run under 13 hours for 100 miles, exceed 150 km for 12-Hours, and to reach 270 km for 24-Hours.

Herron has overcome multiple challenges in her life, including injuries as a young runner and her family losing their home in the 1999 Oklahoma tornado outbreak. In February 2019 she won the Tarawera 100 Miler in Rotorua, New Zealand in a new course record of 17:20:52 just two weeks after surviving a rollover car accident.

World Records
According to the International Association of Ultrarunners, USA Track & Field, and Ultrarunning Magazine she has set World Record/World Best performances at the following distances and surfaces:

Early life and career

Camille was born on Christmas Day in Norman, Oklahoma. Due to body quirks, she adapted a unique running style well suited for ultrarunning. She credits her athletic ability and steely toughness to her grandpa, who earned two Purple Hearts in World War II, and her dad, both of whom played college basketball at Oklahoma State University for 3-time Olympic Team Coach, Henry Iba. Hearing stories of her dad practicing six hours without water, as a 7-year-old she would practice basketball without water until she would black out. When she was 17, her family became homeless when they lost their home and possessions in the 1999 Oklahoma tornado outbreak. She started running long on Sundays to celebrate her life.

She was a 3-time All-Stater in cross country, 3-time State Champion in track and field, and valedictorian at Westmoore High School. She accepted academic and athletic scholarships to the University of Tulsa, where she was a top 10 senior and earned a B.S. in Exercise and Sports Science in 2005. As a young and growing runner, she experienced many injuries and was inspired to understand why so that she could keep herself healthy and running for a lifetime. She got back into competitive running as a road racer in her fifth year of college coached by her husband and former elite runner, Conor Holt. In 2007, Camille graduated from Oregon State University with a Masters of Science degree in Exercise and Sports Science. She worked as a Research Assistant in bone imaging/osteoimmunology at the University of Oklahoma Health Sciences Center and has co-authored numerous scientific manuscripts. She and her husband manage an online coaching business.

Honors and Notable Performances
She is a three-time Olympic Marathon Trials qualifier, 21-time marathon winner, and Guinness World Records holder for the fastest marathon in a Superhero costume, running 2:48:51 dressed as Spiderwoman. She represented Team USA in the marathon at the 2011 Pan American Games, finishing 9th. She came back 13 days later to finish as the 3rd American and 18th overall at the New York City Marathon. She was the first 3-time winner of the Oklahoma City Memorial Marathon.

As an ultrarunner, she's won five USATF titles (50K Road, 50 Mi Road, 100K Road, 100K Trail, 100 Mi Road). In 2015, she became the first ultrarunner to win two World titles in the same year, winning the IAU 100 km World Championships and the IAU 50 km World Championships. In June 2017, she became only the 3rd American to win the Comrades Marathon, leading from start-to-finish. In a memorable finish, she accidentally stopped at the wrong timing mat after receiving the penultimate baton and rose. A male runner came from behind, tapped her on the shoulder, and pointed that she wasn't done yet. She went into a sprint the final 200m to win.

In October 2015, she set the 50-mile World/American Road Best of 5:38:41 at the Fall 50, surpassing Ann Trason's 5:40:18 performance from 1991. Her first 100 Mile World Record of 12:42:40 at the 2017 Tunnel Hill 100 is also the fastest women's time on trail, averaging 7:37 per mile. For her 100 Mile and 24Hr World Records, she won the races outright beating all of the men. She was the top ranked American 24Hr runner, including both men and women, going into the 2019 IAU 24 Hour World Championship, where she won her third World title and bettered her 24-hour World Record by running .

In 2020, she won the Black Canyon 100K, USATF 50K Road National Championship, and the JFK 50 Mile.

In 2021, she won the Javelina Jundred in 14:03:23 and finished 4th overall, breaking the previous course record by 49 minutes. She came back six weeks later to break her American and track World Records for 100 miles in 13:21:51 at the Desert Solstice Track Invitational.

In 2022 as a newly minted 40-year-old Master's runner, she won the Jackpot 100/US Championship outright beating all of the men by almost 30 minutes. She broke her 12-Hour (93.896 miles/151.111 km) American (ratified by USATF in December 2022) and World Records (pending ratification by the IAU). She also broke her 100 Mile American/World Records, which is pending ratification and a course remeasurement. 

On April 7, 2022 at age 40, she became the youngest woman on record to log 100,000 lifetime miles.

At the 2022 Desert Solstice Track Invitational, she broke her Open and Masters Track American Records for 50 miles, 100km, and 100 miles, Open Track World Record for 100 miles, and the W40-44 Track World Records for 100km, 12Hr, and 100 miles. In 2022, she won three races outright, beating all of the men.

She is a four-time IAU International Ultra Runner of the Year. She is also a five-time honoree of the USATF Ruth Anderson Ultrarunner of the Year award, seven-time USATF Athlete of the Week honoree, the 2017 Ultrarunning Magazine Female Ultrarunner of the Year, and four-time Ultra Performance of the Year. In 2022, she was voted USATF Master's MUT Runner of the Year and the RRCA Master's Runner of the Year.

References

External links 
 

1981 births
Living people
American female long-distance runners
American female ultramarathon runners
American female marathon runners
Sportspeople from Norman, Oklahoma
Sportspeople from Oklahoma City
Track and field athletes from Oklahoma
University of Tulsa alumni
Oregon State University alumni
Athletes (track and field) at the 2011 Pan American Games
Pan American Games track and field athletes for the United States
21st-century American women
Tulsa Golden Hurricane women's track and field athletes